"Morose" is a song by Belgian rapper Damso released in 2021 from his album QALF Infinity. It reached number one in Wallonia and France.

Charts

Weekly charts

Year-end charts

References

2021 songs
2021 singles
French-language Belgian songs